Harold "Hal" Schacker (April 6, 1925 – October 2, 2015) was a Major League Baseball pitcher who appeared in six games, all in relief, for the Boston Braves in 1945. He was born in Brooklyn, New York, and was Jewish.

Schacker is one of many ballplayers who only appeared in the major leagues during World War II. He made his major league debut on May 9, 1945 against the Pittsburgh Pirates at Braves Field, with his final appearance on June 14. In a total of 15 innings pitched he was 0–1 with 3 games finished, struck out 6, and walked 9. He gave up 12 runs (9 earned), giving him an ERA of 5.28.

References

External links 
, or Retrosheet

1925 births
2015 deaths
Anniston Rams players
Baseball players from New York (state)
Boston Braves players
Hartford Bees players
Hartford Chiefs players
Hartford Laurels players
Indianapolis Indians players
Jewish American baseball players
Jewish Major League Baseball players
Major League Baseball pitchers
Minot Mallards players
Pawtucket Slaters players
Sherbrooke Athletics players
St. Hyacinthe Saints players
St. Petersburg Saints players
West Palm Beach Indians players
21st-century American Jews
Temple Eagles players